Fernando Sinecio González Torres (born 16 June 1986) is a former Mexican footballer who last played as a forward for Correcaminos UAT.

References

1986 births
Living people
Association football forwards
Potros UAEM footballers
C.D. Veracruz footballers
La Piedad footballers
Correcaminos UAT footballers
Ascenso MX players
Liga Premier de México players
Footballers from the State of Mexico
People from Toluca
Mexican footballers